Leo Jørgensen (29 January 1903 – 1 December 1968) was a Danish sprinter. He competed in the men's 100 metres at the 1928 Summer Olympics.

References

1903 births
1968 deaths
Athletes (track and field) at the 1928 Summer Olympics
Danish male sprinters
Olympic athletes of Denmark
Place of birth missing